Wilhelm Waiblinger (21 November 1804 – 17 or 30 January 1830) was a German romantic poet, mostly remembered today in connection with Friedrich Hölderlin. After he had attended Gymnasium Illustre in Stuttgart, he was a student at the seminary of Tübingen in the 1820s, when Hölderlin, already mentally ill, lived there as a recluse in a carpenter's house. Waiblinger, who used to visit the older poet and take him out for walks, left an account of Hölderlin's life then, Hölderlins Leben, Dichtung und Wahnsinn ("Hölderlin's life, poetry and madness"). In the late 1820s, Waiblinger left Tübingen for Italy, dying at the age of 25 in Rome, where he is buried in the Protestant Cemetery.

In his short story "Im Presselschen Gartenhaus" ("In Pressel’s Garden-house", 1913), Hermann Hesse gives a touching picture of a visit to Hölderlin by Waiblinger and the poet Eduard Mörike, both young theology students in Tübingen, like Hölderlin himself decades before.

Notes

References
Lee Byron Jennings: "An Early German Vampire Tale: Wilhelm Waiblinger's 'Olura'" (first-published in 1986). In: Suevica. Beiträge zur schwäbischen Literatur- und Geistesgeschichte, Vol. 9 (2001/2002). Stuttgart 2004 [2005], pp. 295–306.

External links
Waiblinger's 1830 essay "Hölderlin's life, poetry and madness"
Hesse's 1913 story "In Pressel’s Garden-house" – PDF file

1804 births
1830 deaths
People from Heilbronn
People from the Kingdom of Württemberg
German poets
Burials in the Protestant Cemetery, Rome
German male poets
19th-century German poets
19th-century German male writers
People educated at Eberhard-Ludwigs-Gymnasium